Marco Foschi (born 1 April 1977) is an Italian actor and voice actor. He played in the 2012 film King of the Sands directed by Najdat Anzour and in the 2012 American-Italian television movie Barabbas, as Jesus.

References

External links

1977 births
Living people
Italian male voice actors
Italian male television actors
Italian male film actors
21st-century Italian male actors
Male actors from Rome